Sanjay Kumar Yadav is a Nepalese politician and a member of Provincial Assembly of Madhesh Province belonging to People's Socialist Party, Nepal. Yadav, a resident of Kabilasi, Sarlahi, was elected via 2017 Nepalese provincial elections from Sarlahi 3(B) constituency. Back in 2017, he was a party candidate from the Federal Socialist Forum, Nepal for provincial assembly election.

Personal life
Yadav was born on 24 January 1986 to father Nawal Kishor Yadav and mother Rajkali Devi.

Electoral history

2017 Nepalese provincial elections

References

Living people
1986 births
Madhesi people
21st-century Nepalese politicians
Members of the Provincial Assembly of Madhesh Province
People's Socialist Party, Nepal politicians
People from Sarlahi District